Vincenzo D'Angelo (22 January 1951 – 6 February 2008) was an Italian water polo player who competed in the 1976 Summer Olympics, in the 1980 Summer Olympics, and in the 1984 Summer Olympics.

See also
 List of Olympic medalists in water polo (men)
 List of World Aquatics Championships medalists in water polo

References

External links
 

1951 births
2008 deaths
Italian male water polo players
Water polo players at the 1976 Summer Olympics
Water polo players at the 1980 Summer Olympics
Water polo players at the 1984 Summer Olympics
Olympic silver medalists for Italy in water polo
Medalists at the 1976 Summer Olympics
Sportspeople from the Province of Naples